This glossary of electrical and electronics engineering is a list of definitions of terms and concepts related specifically to electrical engineering and electronics engineering. For terms related to engineering in general, see Glossary of engineering.

A

B

C

D

E

F

G

H

I

J

K

L

M

N

O

P

Q

R

S

T

U

V

W

X

Y

Z

See also
Glossary of engineering
Glossary of civil engineering
Glossary of mechanical engineering
Glossary of structural engineering

References

Electrical-engineering-related lists
Electronic engineering
electrical and electronics engineering
Electrical and electronics engineering
Wikipedia glossaries using description lists